This page lists all described species of the spider family Euagridae accepted by the World Spider Catalog :

A

Allothele

Allothele Tucker, 1920
 A. australis (Purcell, 1903) — South Africa
 A. caffer (Pocock, 1902) (type) — South Africa
 A. malawi Coyle, 1984 — Malawi, South Africa
 A. regnardi (Benoit, 1964) — Congo, Angola
 A. teretis Tucker, 1920 — South Africa

Australothele

Australothele Raven, 1984
 A. bicuspidata Raven, 1984 — Australia (New South Wales)
 A. jamiesoni Raven, 1984 — Australia (Queensland, New South Wales)
 A. maculata Raven, 1984 (type) — Australia (Queensland)
 A. magna Raven, 1984 — Australia (Queensland)
 A. montana Raven, 1984 — Australia (New South Wales)
 A. nambucca Raven, 1984 — Australia (New South Wales)
 A. nothofagi Raven, 1984 — Australia (Queensland, New South Wales)

C

Caledothele

Caledothele Raven, 1991
 C. annulatus (Raven, 1981) — New Caledonia, Loyalty Is.
 C. aoupinie Raven, 1991 — New Caledonia
 C. australiensis (Raven, 1984) (type) — Australia (Victoria)
 C. carina Raven, 1991 — New Caledonia
 C. elegans Raven, 1991 — New Caledonia
 C. tonta Raven, 1991 — New Caledonia
 C. tristata Raven, 1991 — New Caledonia

Carrai

Carrai Raven, 1984
 C. afoveolata Raven, 1984 (type) — Australia (New South Wales)

Cethegus

Cethegus Thorell, 1881
 C. barraba Raven, 1984 — Australia (New South Wales)
 C. broomi (Hogg, 1901) — Australia (New South Wales)
 C. colemani Raven, 1984 — Australia (Queensland)
 C. daemeli Raven, 1984 — Australia (Queensland)
 C. elegans Raven, 1984 — Australia (Queensland)
 C. fugax (Simon, 1908) — Australia (Western Australia, South Australia)
 C. hanni Raven, 1984 — Australia (Queensland)
 C. ischnotheloides Raven, 1985 — Australia (South Australia)
 C. lugubris Thorell, 1881 (type) — Australia (Queensland)
 C. multispinosus Raven, 1984 — Australia (Queensland)
 C. pallipes Raven, 1984 — Australia (Queensland)
 C. robustus Raven, 1984 — Australia (Queensland)

Chilehexops

Chilehexops Coyle, 1986
 C. australis (Mello-Leitão, 1939) — Chile
 C. misionensis Goloboff, 1989 — Argentina
 C. platnicki Coyle, 1986 (type) — Chile

E

Euagrus

Euagrus Ausserer, 1875
 E. anops Gertsch, 1973 — Mexico
 E. atropurpureus Purcell, 1903 — South Africa
 E. carlos Coyle, 1988 — Mexico to Costa Rica
 E. cavernicola Gertsch, 1971 — Mexico
 E. charcus Coyle, 1988 — Mexico
 E. chisoseus Gertsch, 1939 — USA, Mexico
 E. comstocki Gertsch, 1935 — USA
 E. formosanus Saito, 1933 — Taiwan
 E. garnicus Coyle, 1988 — Mexico
 E. gertschi Coyle, 1988 — Mexico
 E. guatemalensis F. O. Pickard-Cambridge, 1897 — Guatemala
 E. gus Coyle, 1988 — Mexico
 E. josephus Chamberlin, 1924 — Mexico
 E. leones Coyle, 1988 — Mexico
 E. luteus Gertsch, 1973 — Mexico
 E. lynceus Brignoli, 1974 — Mexico, Guatemala
 E. mexicanus Ausserer, 1875 (type) — Mexico
 E. pristinus O. Pickard-Cambridge, 1899 — Mexico
 E. rothi Coyle, 1988 — USA
 E. rubrigularis Simon, 1890 — Mexico
 E. troglodyta Gertsch, 1982 — Mexico
 E. zacus Coyle, 1988 — Mexico

L

Leptothele

Leptothele Raven & Schwendinger, 1995
 L. bencha Raven & Schwendinger, 1995 (type) — Thailand
 L. chang Schwendinger, 2020 — Thailand

M

Malayathele

Malayathele Schwendinger, 2020
 M. cameronensis Schwendinger, 2020 — Malaysia (Peninsula)
 M. kanching Schwendinger, 2020 (type) — Malaysia (Peninsula)
 M. maculosa Schwendinger, 2020 — Malaysia (Peninsula)
 M. ulu Schwendinger, 2020 — Malaysia (Peninsula)

N

Namirea

Namirea Raven, 1984
 N. dougwallacei Raven, 1993 — Australia (Queensland)
 N. eungella Raven, 1984 — Australia (Queensland)
 N. fallax Raven, 1984 — Australia (New South Wales)
 N. insularis Raven, 1984 — Australia (Queensland)
 N. johnlyonsi Raven, 1993 — Australia (Queensland)
 N. montislewisi Raven, 1984 — Australia (Queensland)
 N. planipes Raven, 1984 (type) — Australia (Queensland)

P

Phyxioschema

Phyxioschema Simon, 1889
 P. erawan Schwendinger, 2009 — Thailand
 P. eripnastes Schwendinger, 2009 — Thailand
 P. gedrosia Schwendinger & Zamani, 2018 — Iran
 P. huberi Schwendinger, 2009 — Thailand
 P. raddei Simon, 1889 (type) — Kazakhstan, Iran, Afghanistan, Uzbekistan, Turkmenistan, Tajikistan
 P. roxana Schwendinger & Zonstein, 2011 — Uzbekistan, Tajikistan
 P. sayamense Schwendinger, 2009 — Thailand
 P. spelaeum Schwendinger, 2009 — Thailand
 P. suthepium Raven & Schwendinger, 1989 — Thailand

S

Stenygrocercus

Stenygrocercus Simon, 1892
 S. alphoreus Raven, 1991 — New Caledonia
 S. franzi Raven, 1991 — New Caledonia
 S. kresta Raven, 1991 — New Caledonia
 S. recineus Raven, 1991 — New Caledonia
 S. silvicola (Simon, 1889) (type) — New Caledonia
 S. simoni Raven, 1991 — New Caledonia

V

Vilchura

Vilchura Ríos-Tamayo & Goloboff, 2017
 V. calderoni Ríos-Tamayo & Goloboff, 2017 (type) — Chile

References

Euagridae